Tugen may refer to:
the Tugen people
the Tugen language
the Tugen Hills